PDI may refer to:

Organisations
 Investigations Police of Chile, the state police force of Chile
 Party for Justice and Integration, an Albanian political party
 Pacific Data Images, former American computer animation production company
 Philippine Daily Inquirer, a broadsheet newspaper in the Philippines and the Philippines' newspaper of record
 Plumbing & Drainage Institute, an American plumbing products manufacturers certification organization
 Ideal Democratic Party, political party in Rwanda
 Partai Demokrasi Indonesia (Indonesian Democratic Party) (1973–2004), a defunct political party
 Polo Democrático Independiente (Independent Democratic Pole), a Colombian leftwing social democratic political party

Chemistry and biochemistry
 Pyridinediimine, organic compounds used as ligands
 Perylenediimide, a member of the rylene dyes
 Protein dispersibility index, a means of comparing the solubility of a protein in water
 Protein disulfide isomerase, an enzyme which catalyzes the formation and breakage of disulfide bonds in proteins
 Polydispersity index, a deprecated term for the molecular weight distribution of polymers

Computing
 Pentaho Data Integration, Pentaho Data Integration (PDI, also called Kettle) is the component of Pentaho responsible for the Extract, Transform and Load (ETL) processes.
 Personal Data Interchange, an information sharing standard developed by the Versit Consortium
 Portable Database Image (.pdi), a file format to store structured databases for reporting and analysis in a highly compressed way
 Program and Debug Interface, an Atmel proprietary interface for external programming and on-chip debugging of computing devices.
 Projected Digital image, a digital image used for projection, often in the context of a photographic competition

Other
 Postal Development Indicator, a ranking developed by the  Universal Postal Union
 Peripheral drift illusion, a motion illusion generated by the presentation of a sawtooth luminance grating in the visual periphery
 Pilot direction indicator, an aircraft instrument that guides a bomber pilot during a bomb run
 Power Distance Index, a statistic in anthropology and social studies that is used to describe the degree of acceptance of unequal power distribution in a society or group
 Powered Descent Initiation, the maneuver of the Apollo Lunar Module as it descended from lunar orbit to landing
 Pre-delivery inspection, the examination of a car, home, or other traded goods before handover to the new owner.